Gadwal Samsthanam was a vassal of the Nizam of Hyderabad. It was once part of Raichur district (though it is now Gadwal in Jogulamba Gadwal district).  It was one of the three important samsthanams, the other two being Wanaparthy Samsthanam and Jatprole Samsthanam.

Historical Places

The Samsthanam has a fort called as Gadwal Fort or Nalla somanadri fort. The fort is in a dilapidated state today.

Lingamma Bavi and Chokkamma Bavi are two wells constructed by Somanadri. The wells were named based on the names of his wives Lingamma and Chokkamma.

The Feudatory
It was once ruled by a feudal lord, Maha Raja Sri Somashekar Ananda bhoopal Reddy, called Somanadri hails from Poodoor village. Gadwal has developed around a fort built by the Gadwal ruler Somanadri. This Gadwal Samsthanam was protected by Mallichetti vamshiyulu. The Nagi Reddy we fondly know Nagappa was an Ayngarashakulu of Gadwal samsthanam (Raja somanadri was a minor). He died in a war with fanatic sultans. Then Narsappa succeeded his father Nagappa as Gadwal Samsthanam  Ayngarashakulu, but unfortunately for some reason he had to leave the palace.

In 1947, Adi Lakshmidevamma was the feudatory queen of Gadwal Samsthanam during Nizam rule. She aided forces led by Sardar Vallabhbhai Patel to annex Hyderabad state into independent India and let those forces to enter Hyderabad state through Gadwal.

List of Rulers
According to the family history, Pedda Veera Reddy, Peddanna Bhupaludu, Sarga Reddy, Veera Reddy and Kumara Veera Reddy ruled Gadwal between 1553 and 1704.

Asthana Purohit 
The last known feudal lord in Gadwal Samsthanam was Maharani Adhilakshmi Devamma who lived in the hereditary fort appointed S.P. Ananda murthy who was in time in-charge of the Agraharam with Ramachandra swamy temple in Gadwal along with the lands in and around it. When the Maharani Adhilaxmi Devamma moved to Hyderabad with her children, S.P.Anandamurthy had appointed S.P. Narashima murthy as the Asthan Purohit to move along with the Asthanam to Hyderabad to perform the Daily rituals at the Palace. S.P. Narashima murthy along with his wife S.P. Subbamma and the adopted child (S. P. Subrahmanyam) moved to Hyderabad

Popular culture
The Samsthanam was the main feature in a hit 2009 Telugu movie, Arundhati and Kondaveeti Raja.

Gallery

See also

Wanaparthy Samsthanam
Papannapet Samsthanam
Samasthans of Hyderabad
Gona Budda Reddy
List of Reddy dynasties and states

References

People from Hyderabad State
People from Mahbubnagar district